This is the discography of American hip hop group Three 6 Mafia. The collective has also released music under the name "Triple Six Mafia". The collective contains two subgroups that have released music independently as "Tear Da Club Up Thugs" and "Da Mafia 6ix". The group has also released music through collaboration projects with other artists under the names "Prophet Posse", "Hypnotize Camp Posse" and "Da Headbussaz".

Albums

Studio albums

Subgroup albums

Collaboration albums

Compilation albums

Mixtapes

Subgroup mixtapes

EPs

Singles

As lead artist

As Da Mafia 6ix

Guest appearances

Da Mafia 6ix

Production credits
Big Kuntry King
00. "Throwback 2004" (featuring T.I.)

Chingy – Hoodstar
03. "Club Gettin' Crowded" (featuring Three 6 Mafia)

Fresh
00. "What Chu Lookin At?"

Goodie Mob – One Monkey Don't Stop No Show
03. "1,2,3, Goodie"

Eevil Stöö – Eevil Stöön Joulumanteli + Rusinat
01. "Eevil Stöö Matkaan Jo Käy"

I-20 – Self Explanatory
08. "Hennessey and Hydro" (featuring Three 6 Mafia)

Knif
00. A Spartan in Wake"

Lil Flip – I Need Mine/U Gotta Feel Me
07. "Represent" (featuring Three 6 Mafia, David Banner)
08. "3,2,1 Go!" (featuring Three 6 Mafia)
15. "I Just Wanna Tell U"

Lil Scrappy – Bred 2 Die Born 2 Live
07. "Posted In The Club" (featuring Three 6 Mafia)

Lil Scrappy
00. "Highest Investment"

Ludacris – Chicken-n-Beer
07. Diamond in the Back (featuring William DeVaugn)
16. "We Got" (featuring Chingy, I-20 and Tity Boi)

Ludacris
00. "Neville Bryce"

Mike Jones – Who Is Mike Jones?
05. "Got It Sewed Up (Remix)"

Pastor Troy – Tool Muziq
05. "Wanting You" (featuring Gangsta Boo)

Paul Wall – The Peoples Champ
01. "I'm a Playa" (featuring Three 6 Mafia)

Santogold – Santogold
00. "Shove It" (featuring Project Pat)

South Breed
00. "Hustleville"

Stat Quo
00. "Closed Mouths" (featuring T.I.)
00. "Slippin Sumthin"

T.C.
00. "If You Got a Problem"
 "Pop It for Some Paper" – Terrence Howard (DJay)
 "Stomp" – Young Buck (featuring T.I. & Ludacris)
 "Takin Hits" – Young Buck (featuring D–Tay)
 "International Player's Anthem" - UGK (featuring Outkast)
 "Hood Rat" – Young Jeezy (featuring Three 6 Mafia & Project Pat)
 "Plays" - Criminal Manne & Frayser Boy (featuring Gucci Mane)

Music videos

As lead artist
"Tear Da Club Up '97"
"Late Night Tip"
"Hit A Muthafucka"
"Who Run It"
"Sippin on Some Syzurp" (featuring UGK & Project Pat)
"Tongue Ring"
"2-Way Freak" (featuring La Chat)
"Baby Mama" (featuring La Chat)
"Ridin' Spinners" (featuring Lil Flip)
"Ghetto Chick"
"Who I Iz" (featuring Trillville, Lil Wyte, Frayser Boy)
"Stay Fly" (featuring 8Ball, MJG & Young Buck)
"Poppin My Collar" (featuring Project Pat)
"Side 2 Side" (Clean Version) (featuring Bow Wow)
"Side 2 Side" (Explicit Version)
"Doe Boy Fresh" (featuring Chamillionaire)
"I'd Rather" (featuring DJ Unk)
"Lolli Lolli (Pop That Body)" (featuring Project Pat, Yung D & Superpower)
"That's Right" (featuring Akon)
"Lil Freak (Ugh Ugh Ugh)" (featuring Webbie)
"Shake My" (featuring Kalenna)
"Feel It" (vs. Tiësto with Flo Rida & Sean Kingston)
"Shots After Shots" (featuring Tech N9ne)
"Keep My Name Out Yo Mouth" (featuring Project Pat, Billy Wes & Waka Flocka Flame)
"Throwed Off"

As Da Mafia 6ix
"Go Hard" (featuring Yelawolf)
"Remember" (featuring Lil Wyte)
"Where Is Da Bud"
"Break Da Law"
"Beacon N Blender"
"Been Had Hard"
"Surprize" (with Insane Clown Posse as The Killjoy Club) (featuring Young Wicked aka Otis)
"Lock'm N Da Trunk" (featuring DJ Zirk)
"Hear Sum Evil Intro"
"Hydrocodone" (featuring Charlie P)
"Residence Evil"
"Gimmi Back My Dope (Remix)" (featuring Snootie Wild)
"Forever Get High" (featuring Fiend & La Chat)
"Dat Ain't Inya" (*featuring Fiend & La Chat)
"You Can't" (featuring Lil Infamous & Locodunit)
"No Good Deed" (featuring La Chat)
"Hundid Thou Wow" (featuring Billy Wes)
"High Like an Eagle" (featuring Fiend & La Chat)
"As the Tear da Club Up Thugs"
"Push 'em Off"
"Playa Why U Hatin'" (featuring Hot Boys & The Big Tymers)

Notes

References 

Hip hop discographies
Discographies of American artists